The 2021 KAIF Trophy was the 1st edition of the KAIF Trophy, is a women's club football tournament organised and hosted by the AFA for the women's clubs of association nations. This edition will held from 5–8 August 2021 in Austria. Sponsored by KAIF Energy.

Participants
The following six team's are participating in inaugural tournament.

Venue

All matches are played at Donawitz Stadium located in Leoben, Austria.

Draw
The draw of the tournament was held on 27 July 2021 at Leoben, Austria. The six participants will contest in round Robin league for the trophy.

Group stage

Third place match

Final

Statistics

Goalscorers

References

External links

 football in Austria

Women's association football competitions in Europe